Walk On may refer to:

Music 
Walk On, a 1994 album by Boston, and its title song

Albums 
Walk On (John Hiatt album), 1995
Walk On (Randy Johnston album), 1992
Walk On, a 2007 album by Kellie Coffey

Songs 
"Walk On" (Reba McEntire song), 1990
"Walk On" (U2 song), 2001
"Walk On", by Corinne Bailey Rae from The Heart Speaks in Whispers (2016)
"Walk On", by Deep Purple from Bananas, 2003
"Walk On", by Hilltop Hoods from The Calling, 2003
"Walk On", by Jimmy Barnes from Freight Train Heart, 1987
"Walk On", by Neil Young from On the Beach, 1974
"Walk On", by Roy Orbison from Roy Orbison's Many Moods, 1964
"Baby, Walk On", a 1990 song by Matraca Berg; also recorded by Linda Ronstadt as "Walk On"

Other uses 
Walk-on (sports), an athlete who becomes part of a team without being actively recruited
Walk-on (actor), a performer in a small role with no dialogue